The first Paris City Chess Championship was held in 1925. Since 1989 the title of Paris Champion has been awarded to the highest-placed French player licensed in Île-de-France for the current and previous season.

{| class="sortable wikitable"
! # !! Year !! Winner
|-
| 1 || 1925  || Abraham BaratzVitaly Halberstadt
|-
| 2 || 1926  || Leon Schwartzmann
|-
| 3 || 1927  || Abraham Baratz
|-
| 4 || 1928  || Abraham Baratz
|-
| 5 || 1929  || Tihomil Drezga
|-
| 6 || 1930  || Josef Cukierman
|-
| 7 || 1931  || Eugene Znosko-Borovsky
|-
| 8 || 1932  || Oscar Blum
|-
| 9 || 1933  || Alexander Alekhine
|-
| 10 || 1934  || Nicolas Rossolimo
|-
| 11 || 1935  || Léon Monosson
|-
| 12 || 1936  || Nicolas Rossolimo
|-
| 13 || 1937  || Volodia Matveeff
|-
| 14 || 1938  || Maurice Raizman
|-
|    || 1939–40  || not held
|-
| 17 || 1941  || Volodia Matveeff
|-
| 18 || 1942  || Robert Crépeaux
|-
| 19 || 1943  || Constant Schoen
|-
| 20 || 1944  || César Boutteville
|-
| 21 || 1945  || César Boutteville
|-
| 22 || 1946  || César Boutteville
|-
| 23 || 1947  || Nicolas Rossolimo
|-
| 24 || 1948  || Nicolas Rossolimo
|-
| 25 || 1949  || Nicolas Rossolimo
|-
| 26 || 1950  || 
|-
| 27 || 1951  || Stepan Popel
|-
| 28 || 1952  || César Boutteville
|-
| 29 || 1953  || Stepan Popel
|-
| 30 || 1954  || Stepan Popel
|-
| 31 || 1955  || Pierre Rolland
|-
| 32 || 1956  || Borko Simonovic
|-
| 33 || 1957  || Jacques Ratner 
|-
| 34 || 1958  || Guy Mazzoni
|-
| 35 || 1959  || Gérard Linais 
|-
| 36 || 1961  || César Boutteville
|-
| 37 || 1962  || François Molnar
|-
| 38 || 1963  || François Molnar
|-
| 39 || 1964  || François Molnar 
|-
| 40 || 1965  || Bogdan Ducic
|-
| 41 || 1966  || Miodrag Todorcevic 
|-
| 42 || 1967  || Miodrag Todorcevic 
|-
| 43 || 1968  || Claude Jean
|-
| 44 || 1969  || Bernard Huguet
|-
| 45 || 1970  || Kristian Cormier
|-
| 46 || 1971  || Alexanadar Obradovic 
|-
| 47 || 1972  || César Boutteville 
|-
| 48 || 1973  || Miodrag Todorcevic
|-
| 49 || 1974  || Miodrag Todorcevic
|-
| 50 || 1975  || Jacques Maclès
|-
| 51 || 1976  || Miodrag Todorcevic
|-
| 52 || 1977  || Georges Noradounguian 
|-
| 53 || 1978  || Christian Lécuyer
|-
| 54 || 1979  || 
|-
| 55 || 1980  || Israel Zilber (off contest)Nicolas Giffard
|-
| 56 || 1981  || Didier Sellos
|-
| 57 || 1982  || Éric Prié
|-
| 58 || 1983  || Éric Prié
|-
| 59 || 1984  || 
|-
| 60 || 1985  || Slim Belkhodja
|-
| 61 || 1986  || Nabil Doghri
|-
| 62 || 1987  || Jacques Maclès
|-
| 63 || 1988  || Didier Sellos
|-
| 64 || 1989  || Christophe Bernard
|-
| 65 || 1990  || Manuel Apicella
|-
| 66 || 1991  || Jacques Elbilia
|-
| 67 || 1992  || Éric Prié
|-
| 68 || 1993  || Laurent Vérat
|-
| 69 || 1994  || Jacques Demarre
|-
| 70 || 1995  || Olivier Renet
|-
| 71 || 1996  || Éric Prié
|-
| 72 || 1997  || 
|-
| 73 || 1998  || Éloi Relange
|-
| 74 || 1999  || Ashot Anastasian (off contest)Éloi Relange
|-
| 75 || 2000  || Stanislav Savchenko (off contest)Joël Lautier
|-
| 76 || 2001  || Christian Bauer (off contest)Luc Bergèz
|-
| 77 || 2002  || Yochanan Afek (off contest)Laurent Fressinet
|-
| 78 || 2003  || Alberto David (off contest)Thal Abergel
|-
| 79 || 2004  || Jean-Marc Degraeve
|-
| 80 || 2005  || Alberto David (off contest)Laurent Fressinet
|-
| 81 || 2006  || Murtas Kazhgaleyev (off contest)Daniel Fridman
|-
| 82 || 2007  || Maxime Vachier-Lagrave
|-
| 83 || 2008  || Maxime Vachier-Lagrave
|-
| 84 || 2009  || Murtas Kazhgaleyev (off contest)Sergey Fedorchuk
|-
| 85 || 2010  || Sebastien Feller
|-
| 86 || 2011 || Arun Prasad (off contest)Sergey Fedorchuk
|-
| 87 || 2012 || Sergey Fedorchuk
|-
| 88 || 2013 || Adrien Demuth
|-
| 89 || 2014 || Sergey Fedorchuk
|-
| 90 || 2015 || S. P. Sethuraman (off contest)Olivier Renet
|-
| 91 || 2016 || Jules Moussard
|-
| 92 || 2017 || Bilel Bellahcene
|-
| 93 || 2018 ||Jules Moussard
|-
| 94 || 2019 ||Jules Moussard
|}

References

Chess competitions
Chess in France
1925 in chess
1925 in French sport
Recurring sporting events established in 1925
Chess Championship